Calvin Sinclair Lowry (born February 13, 1983) is an American football coach and former player.

Early years
Lowry starred at wide receiver and defensive back at Douglas Byrd High School in Fayetteville, North Carolina.

Playing career
He played professionally as a safety for the Tennessee Titans, Denver Broncos, Jacksonville Jaguars, Detroit Lions, and Omaha Nighthawks. He was drafted by the Titans in the fourth round of the 2006 NFL Draft. He played college football at Penn State.

Coaching career
In January 2015, he was hired to be an assistant coach at Tulsa.

In January 2023, Lowry joined the staff at his alma mater, Penn State as an offensive analyst.

References

External links
Just Sports Stats
Denver Broncos bio
Jacksonville Jaguars bio

1983 births
Living people
Players of American football from Texas
American football safeties
Penn State Nittany Lions football players
Tennessee Titans players
Denver Broncos players
Jacksonville Jaguars players
Detroit Lions players
Omaha Nighthawks players
Tulsa Golden Hurricane football coaches
Sportspeople from Fayetteville, North Carolina
Players of American football from North Carolina